Celmira is a town in the Chiriquí province of Panama.

Sources 
World Gazeteer: Panama – World-Gazetteer.com

Populated places in Chiriquí Province